Siesta Shores is a census-designated place (CDP) in Zapata County, Texas, United States. The population was 1,382 at the 2010 census.

Geography
Siesta Shores is located at  (26.856887, -99.252222).

Demographics

As of the census of 2000, there were 890 people, 292 households, and 244 families residing in the CDP. The population density was 1,418.1 people per square mile (545.4/km2). There were 457 housing units at an average density of 728.2/sq mi (280.1/km2). The racial makeup of the CDP was 83.48% White, 0.34% African American, 0.34% Native American, 0.11% Asian, 14.61% from other races, and 1.12% from two or more races. Hispanic or Latino of any race were 79.89% of the population.

There were 292 households, out of which 42.5% had children under the age of 18 living with them, 69.5% were married couples living together, 11.3% had a female householder with no husband present, and 16.4% were non-families. 14.0% of all households were made up of individuals, and 5.8% had someone living alone who was 65 years of age or older. The average household size was 3.05 and the average family size was 3.36.

In the CDP, the population was spread out, with 32.6% under the age of 18, 10.1% from 18 to 24, 23.1% from 25 to 44, 19.6% from 45 to 64, and 14.6% who were 65 years of age or older. The median age was 32 years. For every 100 females, there were 91.4 males. For every 100 females age 18 and over, there were 88.1 males.

The median income for a household in the CDP was $24,808, and the median income for a family was $27,679. Males had a median income of $30,208 versus $13,207 for females. The per capita income for the CDP was $11,484. About 14.6% of families and 19.2% of the population were below the poverty line, including 25.5% of those under age 18 and 5.1% of those age 65 or over.

Education
All of Zapata County is a part of the Zapata County Independent School District.

References

Census-designated places in Zapata County, Texas
Census-designated places in Texas